The following is a list of the highest-grossing opening weekends for animated films. The list is dominated by recent films due to steadily increasing marketing budgets, and modern films opening on more screens. Another contributing factor is inflation not being taken into account.

Biggest worldwide openings for an animated film since 2002

This list charts animated films that had openings in excess of $100 million worldwide. Since animated films do not open on Fridays in many markets, the 'opening' is taken to be the gross between the first day of release and the first Sunday. Figures prior to the year 2002 are not available.

Figures are given in United States dollars (USD). 2013 is the most represented year, with four films. The Ice Age franchise is the most represented franchise with three films. Pixar is the most represented studio, with six films on the list.

This list does not take into account country-by-country variations in release dates. Therefore, in some cases opening weekend grosses from many, or even most countries may not be included.

Timeline of biggest worldwide openings for an animated film since 2001

At least 7 animated films have held the record of highest-grossing animated film at different times. Pixar has hold the record the most of any time with three films in 2001, 2018 and 2019
.

Biggest opening weekend in U.S. and Canada for an animated film

This list charts the top 50 highest-grossing opening weekends in the U.S. and Canada for an animated film.

Figures are given in United States dollars (USD). Ninety-eight percent of the films in the top 50 were released after 2000 & 2015 and 2016 is the most represented year, with six films each. Despicable Me is the most represented franchise, with 5 films.

DreamWorks Animation and Pixar are the most represented studios with 17 films each on the list.

Opening weekend record holders in U.S. and Canada since 1982
These are the films that, when first released, set the opening three-day weekend record after going into wide release.

At least 14 animated films have held the record of highest-grossing animated film at different times since 1982. Two of these were in the DreamWorks animations Shrek franchise. Disney and Pixar held the record five times each as of 2018.

Biggest opening week in U.S. and Canada for an animated film
This list charts animated films that had openings in excess of $70 million in their first week.

Figures are given in United States dollars (USD). 42.8% of the films in the top 35 were released after 2010, 2016 is the most represented year, with four films. Shrek, Madagascar, and Despicable Me are the most represented franchises with three films. All films in Cars, The Incredibles, Finding Nemo, Madagascar main film series, and Despicable Me franchises are on the list. Pixar is the most represented studio with 14 films on the list.

Biggest opening day in U.S. and Canada for an animated film

This list charts animated films that had openings in excess of $16 million on their first day of release in the U.S. and Canada. Figures are given in United States dollars (USD). 64% of the films in this list were released after 2010. 2018 is the most represented year on the list with 4 films.

All films in the main series Cars, Despicable Me, Monsters, Inc., Finding Nemo and The Incredibles are present on this list and Despicable Me is the most represented franchise with 4 films. Pixar is the most represented studios with 13 films on the list.

Biggest opening weekends outside the United States for an animated film since 2002

This list charts the biggest opening weekends outside the United States for an animated film since 2002. Figures are given in United States dollars (USD). 75% of the films in the top 12 were released after 2010. 2011 are the most represented years on the list with 4 films. Films must exceed $40 million.

Pixar is the most represented studios with 5 films on the list.

See also
 List of highest-grossing animated films
 List of highest-grossing openings for films
 Most expensive animated films

References

Openings
Lists of animated films
Film-related lists of superlatives